Joe Anderson (born 26 March 1982) is an English film actor and singer best known for his work in Across the Universe, Becoming Jane, Control, The Ruins, The Crazies, Horns and as Alistair in The Twilight Saga: Breaking Dawn – Part 2 (2012). Asa Farrell in the WGN America drama series Outsiders. He also played Joseph in The Reckoning.

Personal life
Anderson attended Richmond upon Thames College and later the Webber Douglas Academy of Dramatic Art in London. He has been acting professionally since childhood. His skills include photography, guitar and gymnastics. His father is actor Miles Anderson; his mother is talent agent Lesley Duff. He was diagnosed with dyslexia and attributes his move into acting to this.

Career
Anderson has worked in film, television and on stage at the Chichester Festival Theatre. Earlier in his career he appeared in Copying Beethoven, playing Ludwig van Beethoven's nephew Karl. He then starred as Max Carrigan, a young American man, drafted into the Vietnam War in Across the Universe. After that, he appeared in period film Becoming Jane as Henry Austen, Jane Austen's older brother, then as bassist Peter Hook of the band Joy Division in Anton Corbijn's 2007 film Control. In 2008, he played Elliot in The 27 Club and a German tourist in The Ruins. In 2009, he starred in High Life as Donnie and in Love Happens as the musician boyfriend of Jennifer Aniston's character. He was also seen in Amelia, the biopic of Amelia Earhart, and in Operation: Endgame as the main character Fool. He appeared in 2010's The Crazies, a remake of the 1973 horror film of the same name.

He and his castmates from Control were featured in The Killers' music video for their version of the Joy Division song "Shadowplay".

In an interview with Pure Movies, he said that talking about himself made him "uncomfortable" and feel "self indulgent" and that he struggled with it.

In 2012, he starred as Lincoln Cole in the television series The River. Anderson co-starred alongside Dwayne Johnson in Hercules (2014).

In December 2014, it was announced that Anderson would be replacing Michael Pitt in the role of Mason Verger in the third season of the TV series Hannibal.

Awards
Anderson received the Rising Star Award at the California Independent Film Festival in 2008. He was named Best Actor Drama at Fort Lauderdale International Film Festival 2008 for his performance in The 27 Club.

Musical performances
Anderson appeared in several music related films in which he also performed musical pieces.

In Across the Universe, he sang covers of Beatles songs. The numbers he performed solo or with other cast members included "Hey Jude", "Happiness Is a Warm Gun", "With a Little Help from My Friends", "Strawberry Fields Forever", "Dear Prudence", "Because" and "I Want You (She's So Heavy)". All of these recordings were released on the corresponding soundtrack album.

In Control, as bassist Peter Hook of the group Joy Division, he and his cast mates performed "Transmission", "Leaders of Men" and "Candidate" among others. These three performances were shown in their entirety in the special features under the extended performance scenes section of the DVD. "Transmission" was the only recording by the cast released on the soundtrack album.

In The 27 Club, Anderson played the bassist of a successful music duo called Finn. He and cast/bandmate James Forgey penned the theme song for the film. A studio version and an acoustic version of the song were made available on the film's official website.

In Horns, Anderson played Terry Perrish, a famous trumpet player and brother of Ig Parrish, played by Daniel Radcliffe. In the film, Anderson performs lead trumpet in a scene with the band The Brass Action.

Filmography

Film

Television

Awards and nominations

References

External links

1982 births
Alumni of the Webber Douglas Academy of Dramatic Art
English male film actors
English male stage actors
Place of birth missing (living people)
English male television actors
Living people
English male Shakespearean actors
21st-century English male actors
Alumni of Richmond upon Thames College
Actors with dyslexia